Xianren Bridge is a natural arch created by flowing water that has the world's longest recorded span. Carved of limestone karst, the formation bridges Buliu River in the northern Guangxi Zhuang Autonomous Region, China. Because of its remote location, accessible only by a three-hour rafting trip, it was not discovered until recently and remains relatively obscure. An expedition in October 2010 by the Natural Arch and Bridge Society first measured the bridge's span and found it to be  in length.

See also
 List of longest natural arches

References

External links
 Drone footage

Natural arches of China
Landforms of Guangxi
Rock formations of China